Yeop Adlan bin Che Rose is a former Malaysian diplomat who has served as a diplomat in foreign countries, such as Mexico, Brazil, Argentina and a few African countries.

In 2017, he joined the Democratic Action Party.

Honours

Honours of Malaysia
  : 
 Officer of the Order of the Defender of the Realm (K.M.N.) (1980)
 Commander of the Order of Loyalty to the Royal Family of Malaysia (P.S.D.) — Datuk (1991)

References

Living people
Democratic Action Party (Malaysia) politicians
Ambassadors of Malaysia to Mexico
Officers of the Order of the Defender of the Realm
Commanders of the Order of Loyalty to the Royal Family of Malaysia
Year of birth missing (living people)